Northfield is an area of Aberdeen, Scotland.

It has a community council, swimming pool, medical practice and a police office. The Aberdeen Treasure Hub art gallery in the area was opened in November 2016.

Education
There are four primary schools: Westpark School, Bramble Brae School, Heathryburn School and Manor Park School. Secondary age pupils go to Northfield Academy.

Swimming pool 

Northfield Swimming Pool is a council-owned facility with a 25-metre pool.  It was opened in 1996. It closed in March 2019 due to an equipment failure. Later that year, the council announced that the pool would be refurbished and expanded, and would reopen in summer 2021. However, due to the COVID-19 pandemic, the reopening was postponed to summer 2022.

References

Areas of Aberdeen